Lloyd Polite Jr. (born January 3, 1986), is an American R&B singer. Born in New Orleans and raised in Decatur, he initially began his musical career as a member of the preteen-boy band N-Toon. The band disbanded in 2001 and Polite embarked on a solo career in 2003. He subsequently signed a record deal with American music executive Irv Gotti's Murder Inc. Records, under the aegis of Def Jam Recordings. In 2004, Polite released his solo debut single "Southside" (featuring Ashanti), the title-track from his debut album, Southside (2004). The single quickly charted on the US Billboard Hot 100, and became a top 40 hit. His second album Street Love, was released in 2007 and featured the top 20 hits "You" (featuring Lil Wayne) and "Get It Shawty".

Polite's third album Lessons in Love (2008), gave the singer his second top 10 album on the Billboard 200 chart. Polite's career received an enormous boost in 2009–10, after being featured on hip hop record label Young Money's hit single "BedRock", gaining publicity from his presence on the song’s hook. Polite would go on to release Like Me: The Young Goldie EP in 2009. In March 2010, Polite signed to Interscope and Zone 4. His fourth album King of Hearts, was released by the aforementioned labels in 2011. The lead single, "Lay It Down", became a top 10 hit on Billboards Hot R&B/Hip-Hop Songs.

In 2016, Polite released "Tru", his first single in five years, and an EP of the same name, later that year. In August 2018, he released his fifth studio album Tru LP, which included the single "Caramel". The remix of the song, released in February 2019 via an official music video, features female rap group City Girls. In March 2019, Polite joined an all-star lineup of early-2000s artists for The Millennium Tour, which quickly became one of the year's most popular shows.

Polite had a television acting role in 2005 on the UPN show One on One, playing the role of A-Train, boyfriend to main cast member Spirit (played by Sicily). In 2019, he debuted his film acting skills as Gregory Williams, founding member of Switch, in TV One's original biopic, The Bobby Debarge Story.

Early life 

Lloyd Polite Jr. was born on January 3, 1986, in New Orleans, Louisiana, to Lloyd Polite Sr. and Robin Lewis Polite. He grew up in the Calliope Projects in Central City, New Orleans and then moved to Decatur, Georgia. In Decatur, Polite found his desire to sing and later relocated to New York City where he met Irv Gotti.

Musical career

2003–2007: Southside and Street Love 
In 2003, Polite was discovered and signed to Irv Gotti's The Inc. as a solo artist and released his debut album, Southside, on July 20, 2004. It debuted at number 11 on the US Billboard 200 and number three on the Top R&B/Hip-Hop Albums charts. The album's lead single, "Southside", featuring R&B singer Ashanti, managed to peak at number 24 on the Billboard Hot 100 and number 13 on the Top R&B/Hip-Hop Songs charts. The second and final single, "Hey Young Girl" was released in August 2004 and peaked at number 61 on the Top R&B/Hip-Hop Songs chart. Later that year he featured on 8Ball & MJG's "Forever" and Tango Redd's "Let's Cheat". In 2004, Polite was featured on label-mate Ja Rule's "Caught Up"; the song saw minor success in the United States, reaching number 65 on the Top R&B/Hip-Hop Songs chart. However, on the UK Singles Chart the song peaked at number 20.

The singer reentered the recording studios to begin work with producers Bryan-Michael Cox, James Lackey, Jazze Pha, Big Reese and Jasper Cameron and The Inc.'s 7 Aurelius. Released on March 13, 2007, Street Love debuted at number two on the US Billboard 200 and Top R&B/Hip-Hop albums charts, with sales of 145,000 copies emerging as Lloyd's highest debut and biggest first week. It eventually received a gold certification, and has sold over half a million copies domestically. The album's lead single, Jasper Cameron-penned "You", featured rapper Lil Wayne, was a big commercial success, becoming his first top ten single on the Hot 100. In addition, it reached the top position on the Billboard Hot R&B/Hip-Hop Songs chart. The single reached number 45 in the United Kingdom and number 25 in New Zealand. The second single "Get It Shawty" reached number 16 on the Billboard Hot 100 and number four on the Top R&B/Hip-Hop Songs charts. It also reached number 37 in the United Kingdom. The third and final single, "Player's Prayer", was released and peaked at number 74 on the Top R&B/Hip-Hop Songs chart. The song was not promoted and didn't receive a music video. Later in 2007, he was featured on Huey's "When I Hustle" and Dem Franchize Boyz's "Turn Heads", both songs saw minor success in the United States, reaching number 80 and 75 on the Top R&B/Hip-Hop Songs chart.

2008–2009: Lessons in Love 
Lessons in Love was released on August 4, 2008. "The title concept derives from a schoolboy fantasy of mine, where I become a professor of a classroom full of gorgeous girls, and I feel the best thing I can give them that's really worth having is lessons in love!" he said about the issues worked into the tracks. The album debuted at number seven on the Billboard 200 and number one on the Top R&B/Hip-Hop Albums charts, with moderately successful first-week sales 51,000 — about half as many as his previous effort, number two album Street Love. "How We Do It (Around My Way)", featured rapper Ludacris, was released as the first single, peaking at number 77 on the US Billboard Top R&B/Hip-Hop Songs chart and number 75 on the UK charts. Due to the low success of the song, it only appeared on select versions of the album as a bonus track. The second single, "Girls Around the World", featured Lil Wayne and was a moderate hit. It peaked at number 64 on the Billboard Hot 100 and number 13 on the Top R&B/Hip-Hop Songs charts. The third and final single was "Year of the Lover". The single version featured rapper Plies. It only peaked at number one on the Billboard Bubbling Under R&B/Hip-Hop Singles.

In June 2009, it was announced that Politr would depart from The Inc. Records. Lloyd stated that he was "focusing on just growing in general". A song titled "Pusha", produced by The Runners written by Polite, Raymond "Ray-Ray" Gordon, Sean "Slim" McMillion, and The Monarch and featuring Juelz Santana was leaked online. Juelz Santana was later replaced on the song by Lil Wayne but later both verses were put together and was released as the lead single from his EP, Like Me: The Young Goldie EP. Polite also collaborated with Lil Wayne on the song "BedRock" which is the second single from Lil Wayne's record label Young Money compilation album. On March 13 it was confirmed that Lloyd signed to Interscope Records.

2010–2013: King of Hearts 
In May 2010, Polite teamed up with fellow New Orleans native Mystikal and recorded "Set Me Free". The video was shot primarily in the Calliope Projects of New Orleans. The song featured heavy brass sounds and a sample of "Unchain My Heart" by Ray Charles. On July 25, 2010, Lloyd announced via Twitter that his new album will be entitled King of Hearts. It was released on July 5, 2011, and on August 16, 2010, Polite released the first single entitled "Lay It Down". The second single was "Cupid" and the third single released was "Dedication to My Ex (Miss That)"; to date the single is Lloyd's biggest international hit peaking at number three on the Australian and UK charts. The song features André 3000 of OutKast and is narrated by Lil Wayne. 

On October 29, 2012, Polite released his first mixtape The Playboy Diaries Vol. 1. It features Lil Wayne, August Alsina, Trae Tha Truth among others. In January 2013 Polite released a song called "Twerk Off" featuring rapper Juicy J and was produced by Drumma Boy.

2016–present: Tru 
On May 6, 2016, he released his first single in five years titled "Tru", with the audio for the song released on YouTube 12 days later. On June 23, 2016, during an interview, Polite revealed that he had signed a new distribution deal with Empire. Lloyd announced the release of his fifth studio album titled Out My Window on October 25, 2016. On November 7 Polite announced via his Instagram that he would be releasing a new EP before his album on December 9, 2016, titled Tru.

On July 9, 2018, Polite released "Caramel" as the first single from his album Tru. The album was released on August 31.

Personal life 
On September 3, 2010, Polite cut off his signature long hair and donated it to charity. On July 6, 2011, Lloyd revealed a new tattoo of "Guns & Roses" that was tattooed on the back of his head. On March 14, 2016, it was announced and revealed that Lloyd had earned his GED certificate. In an August 2016 interview with Sway Calloway, Polite explains his hiatus through the lyrics of his song "Tru", expressing how he lost an unborn child to an abortion and that it "left a big hole", while also detailing other family issues. In September 2017, Polite's girlfriend gave birth to their son River. The two welcomed their daughter in late 2018.

Discography 

Studio albums
 Southside (2004)
 Street Love (2007)
 Lessons in Love (2008)
 King of Hearts (2011)
 Tru (2018)

References

External links 
Official website
 

1986 births
Living people
21st-century American male singers
21st-century American singers
20th-century African-American male singers
American contemporary R&B singers
Countertenors
Def Jam Recordings artists
Murder Inc. Records artists
Interscope Records artists
Singers from Georgia (U.S. state)
Rhythm and blues musicians from New Orleans
Singers from Louisiana
American hip hop dancers
American hip hop singers
Universal Motown Records artists
21st-century African-American male singers
People from Decatur, Georgia